In gridiron football, a punt is a kick performed by dropping the ball from the hands and then kicking the ball before it hits the ground. The most common use of this tactic is to punt the ball downfield to the opposing team, usually on the final down, with the hope of giving the receiving team a field position that is more advantageous to the kicking team when possession changes. The result of a typical punt, barring any penalties or extraordinary circumstances, is a first down for the receiving team. A punt is not to be confused with a drop kick, a kick after the ball hits the ground, now rare in both American and Canadian football.

The type of punt leads to different motion of the football. Alex Moffat invented the now-common spiral punt, as opposed to end-over-end.

Description 
A punt in gridiron football is a kick performed by dropping the ball from the hands and then kicking the ball before it hits the ground. In football, the offense has a limited number of downs, or plays, in which to move the ball at least ten yards. The team in possession of the ball will typically punt the ball to the opposing team when they are on their final down (fourth down in American football, third down in Canadian football), do not want to risk a turnover on downs by not gaining enough yardage to make a first down, and do not believe they are in range for a successful field goal. The purpose of the punt is for the team in possession, or "kicking team", to move the ball as far as possible towards the opponent's end zone; this maximizes the distance the receiving team must advance the ball in order to score a touchdown upon taking possession. Thus, the most common use of this tactic is to punt the ball downfield to the opposing team, usually on the final down, with the hope of giving the receiving team a field position that is more advantageous to the kicking team when possession changes.

A punt play involves the kicking team lining up at the line of scrimmage with the kicker, or punter, typically lined up about 15 yards behind the center (in American football, where the end zone is only ten yards deep as opposed to twenty yards in Canadian football, this distance must be shortened if the kicker's normal position would be on or beyond the end line). The receiving team lines up with one or two players downfield to catch the ball. The center makes a long snap to the kicker who then drops the ball and kicks it before it hits the ground. The player who catches the ball is then entitled to attempt to advance the ball.

The result of a typical punt, barring any penalties or extraordinary circumstances, is a first down for the receiving team at the spot where:
 the receiver or subsequent receiving team ball carrier is downed or goes out of bounds;
 the ball crosses out of bounds, whether in flight or after touching the ground;
 there is "illegal touching", defined as when a player from the kicking team is the first player to touch the ball after it has been punted beyond the line of scrimmage; or
 a ball which is allowed to land comes to rest in-bounds without being touched (American football only).

Other possible results include the punt being blocked behind the line of scrimmage, and the ball being touched, but not caught or possessed, downfield by the receiving team.  In both cases the ball is then "free" and "live" and will belong to whichever team recovers it.

Rules

Common to American and Canadian football 
 If the kicked ball fails to cross the line of scrimmage, it may be picked up and advanced by either team. However, if it is picked up by the kicking team, the play is treated as any other play from scrimmage; i.e., if it is the team's final down, it must advance the ball beyond the first down marker in order to avoid a turnover on downs. There are two ways a punt can fail to cross the line of scrimmage: a blocked kick, in which the opposing team obstructs the path of the punt shortly after it leaves the punter's foot; and a shank, in which the punter fails to advance the kick beyond the line of scrimmage on his own (usually erroneous) action. If a punt crosses the plane above the line of scrimmage at any point during the punt, it is treated as such and the kicking team may not advance it, even if the ball moves on its own volition (either due to a headwind or errant bounce) back behind the line.
 Deliberate, targeted punting to another player on the kicking team behind the line of scrimmage has some strategic advantages (for example, an offensive lineman can receive a forward punt but is not eligible to receive a screen pass) but, because of some  disadvantages (any errant kick that crosses the line of scrimmage would result in lost possession), is extremely rare as a strategy.
 The official rules regulate when and how the receiving team may hit the kicker before, during, and after the kick.
 If the receiving team drops the ball or touches the ball beyond the line of scrimmage without catching it then it is considered a live ball and may be recovered by either team. If the receiving team never had full possession, it is considered to be a muffed punt rather than a fumble. However, the receiving player must be actively pursuing the ball.  If the receiving player is blocked into the ball, it is not considered "touching" the ball.
 A field goal cannot be scored on a punt kick.
 By contrast, the now very rarely attempted drop kick can be used to score either field goals or extra points in both American and Canadian football.

American football 
 The player attempting to catch the kicked ball may attempt a fair catch. If caught, the ball becomes dead and the receiving team gets the ball at the spot of the catch.
 A touchback may be called if any of the following occur: (1) The kicked ball lands in the receiving team's end zone without first touching any player, whether as a direct result of the kick or a bounce. (2) The receiving team catches the ball in its own end zone and downs it before advancing the ball out of the end zone. (In high school football, the ball automatically becomes dead when it crosses the goal line and cannot be returned out of the end zone.) (3) The ball enters then exits the end zone behind the goal line. After a touchback, the receiving team gets the ball at its own 20-yard line.
 If a player from the kicking team is the first to touch the ball after it crosses the line of scrimmage, "illegal touching" is called and the receiving team gains possession at the spot where the illegal touching occurred. This is often not considered to be detrimental to the kicking team; for example, it is common for a player on the kicking team to deliberately touch the ball near the goal line before it enters the end zone to prevent a touchback. Since there is no further yardage penalty awarded, the kicking team is often said to have "downed the ball" when this occurs (and the NFL does not count it as an official penalty). While the ball is not automatically dead upon an illegal touch, and can be advanced by the receiving team (who would then have the choice of accepting the result of the play or taking the ball at the spot of the illegal touch), this rarely happens in practice, as illegal touching typically occurs when members of the kicking team are closer to the ball than members of the receiving team. In the NFL, this is referred to as "first touching," and is considered a "violation," and cannot offset a foul by the receiving team. Moreover, kicking team players are allowed to bat the ball back into the field of play so long as they have not touched the goal line or end zone, even if their bodies enter the air above the end zone; in such cases, the ball is spotted from where the player jumped or the 1-yard line, whichever is farther from the goal line.
 The length of the punt, referred to as punting yards or gross punting yards, is measured from the line of scrimmage (not the spot where the punter punts) to whichever of the following points applies: (1) the spot that a punt is caught; (2) the spot that a punt goes out of bounds; (3) the spot that a punt is declared dead because of illegal touching; or (4) the goal line, for punts that are ruled touchbacks.
 The net punting yardage is taken by calculating the total punting yardage and subtracting any yardage earned by the receiving team on returns, and subtracting 20 yards for each touchback.
 Under no circumstance can the kicking team score points as the direct result of a punt. (It can score indirectly if the receiving team loses possession of the ball or runs back into its own end zone and gets tackled.)

Canadian football 

 The kicker and any players behind him at the time of the kick are considered "onside"; any other players on the kicking team are considered "offside".  This is the same rule that makes all players "onside" on a kickoff since they are behind the ball once kicked.  A player who is onside may recover the kicked ball, while a player who is offside may not be the first to touch the kicked ball and is required to remain at least 5 yards from an opposing player attempting to catch the ball. Violations of these restrictions on an offside player are called "no yards" infractions, with various penalties associated with them.
 The ball remains in play if it enters the goal area (end zone) until it is downed by a player on either team or goes out of bounds:
 If a member of the receiving team downs it in the goal area or the ball goes out of bounds before being brought back into the field of play, a single is awarded to the kicking team and the receiving team gains possession at their own 35-yard line.
 If an onside player downs the ball in the goal area, the kicking team is awarded a touchdown.
 If an offside player downs the ball in the goal area, the receiving team gains possession after a "no yards" penalty is applied from their own 10-yard line.
 If the ball strikes the goalpost assembly while in flight the receiving team gains possession at their own 25-yard line.
 The length of the punt is measured from the line of scrimmage to the spot of the catch or the point where the kick goes out of bounds. The punt return is measured independently, though the value of the punt to the kicking team is determined by distance from the line of scrimmage to the end of the return.
 Canadian rules also allow a punt when the punter is not behind the line of scrimmage, which is not permitted in American rules. This tactic (termed an "open-field kick" in the rule book) is similar to rugby and in the modern game is usually reserved for last-second desperation: for example, a player, after receiving a forward pass with no time left on the clock and with no hope of evading tacklers, may punt the ball in the hope that it will score a single or be recovered by an onside teammate. After recovering a ball kicked by the other team a player can also punt out of his own end zone in order to avoid a single. On at least two occasions in the CFL, the last play of the game was a missed field goal attempt followed by three punts, as the teams alternately tried to avoid a single and score a single.

Types of punts 
The type of punt leads to different motion of the football.

End-over-end punt

Spiral punt 

Alex Moffat is generally recognized as the creator of the spiral punt, having developed it during his time as a college athlete in the early 1880s.  It is the longest type of punt kick. In flight, the ball spins about its long axis, instead of end over end (like a drop punt) or not at all (like a regular punt kick). This makes the flight of the ball more aerodynamic, and the pointy ends of gridiron footballs mitigate the difficulty to catch.

Pooch punt 

Teams may line up in a normal offensive formation and have the quarterback perform a pooch punt, also known as a quick kick. This usually happens in situations where the offense is in a 4th and long situation in their opponent's territory, but are too close to the end zone for a traditional punt and (depending on weather conditions) too far for a field goal try—a situation also known as the dead zone. Like fake punt attempts, these are rarely tried, although Randall Cunningham, Tom Brady, Matt Cassel and Ben Roethlisberger have successfully executed pooch punts in the modern NFL era.  Some pooch punts occur on third down and long situations in American football to fool the defense, which is typically not prepared to return a punt on third down.

Fake punts 
On very rare occasions, a punting team will elect to attempt a "fake punt" — line up in punt formation and begin the process as normal, but instead do one of the following:

 The punter may choose to run with the ball.
 The ball may be snapped to the upback, who then runs with the ball.
 The punter (or another back, who is standing nearby) may decide to pass to a pre-designated receiver.
 The ball may be snapped to the upback, who then passes the ball to a receiver.

Although teams sometimes use fake punts to exploit a weakness in the opposing team's defense, a fake punt is very rare, and often used in desperate situations, such as to keep a drive alive when a team is behind and needs to catch up quickly, or to spark an offense in a game where the defense dominates. The high risk of "fake punts", and the need to maintain an element of surprise when the play is actually called, explains why this play is seldom seen.  Fake punts are more likely to occur when there is short yardage remaining to secure a first down, or the line of scrimmage is inside the opponent's territory.

One of the most famous fake punts was by New York Giants linebacker Gary Reasons during the 1990 NFC Championship Game against the San Francisco 49ers, in which he rushed for 30 yards on a fourth down conversion via a direct snap to him instead of the punter, Sean Landeta, which was a critical difference in a 15–13 victory. The Giants went on to win Super Bowl XXV.

Rugby-style  punt 
A rugby-style punt is done with a running start (usually to the left or right) before punting while remaining behind the line of scrimmage.

Punting records 
 The longest punt in North American pro football history is a 108-yarder by Zenon Andrusyshyn of the CFL's Toronto Argonauts (at Edmonton, October 23, 1977). This record was also tied by Christopher Milo of the Saskatchewan Roughriders on October 29, 2011, at a home game at Mosaic Stadium at Taylor Field in Regina, during which winds gusted above . Mosaic Stadium is also the site of the three longest field goals in CFL history and one of the windiest fields in professional football.
 The longest punt in NFL/AFL play was a 98-yarder by Steve O'Neal of the New York Jets in an American Football League regular season loss to the Denver Broncos at Mile High Stadium on September 21, 1969.
 Jeff Feagles is the all-time NFL career punts and punt yards leader with 1,713 punts and 71,211 punt yards over 352 games.
 Bob Cameron is the all-time CFL career punts and punt yards leader with 3,129 punts and 134,301 punt yards over 394 games.
 Shane Lechler holds the NFL record for career punting average with 47.6 yards per punt.
 Sammy Baugh averaged 51.4 yards per punt in 1940 (35 punts for 1,799 yards). Lechler holds the modern single-season record with a 51.1 yards per punt average in 2009 (96 punts for 4,909 yards)
 The record for college football is held by the University of Nevada's Pat Brady, who booted the longest possible punt on a 100-yard field at 99 yards against Loyola University on October 28, 1950.
 Joe Theismann punted for one yard against the Chicago Bears in 1985.

Return 
A punt return is one of the receiving team's options to respond to a punt.  A player positioned about 35–45 yards from the line of scrimmage (usually a wide receiver or return specialist) will attempt to catch or pick up the ball after it is punted by the opposing team's punter. He then attempts to carry the ball as far as possible back in the direction of the line of scrimmage, without being tackled or running out of bounds.  He may also lateral the ball to teammates in order to keep the play alive should he expect to be tackled or go out of bounds. The punting team may employ a "directional punting" strategy. This strategy has a punter place the ball in a way that pins returners against the sideline deep on their side of the field, minimizing their potential to have a big return. 

DeSean Jackson, then playing for the Philadelphia Eagles in the "Miracle at the New Meadowlands", is the only NFL player to return a punt for a game-winning touchdown on the final play of regulation. The NFL record holder for the number of punt returns for a touchdown in a career is Devin Hester with 14. The CFL career record holder for must punt returns for a touchdown in a career is Gizmo Williams with 26.

See also 
 Glossary of American football
 Short punt formation
 Coffin corner (American football)
 American Football Kicking Hall of Fame
 No Punt Game

References

External links 
 

American football plays